La Sola Island is a small island in the southeastern Caribbean Sea. The island is a part of the Dependencias Federales (Federal Dependencies) of Venezuela.

Geography

The uninhabited island has an area of barely 500 square meters, with the highest point reaching 8.5 meters (28 feet).

History
In 1938, the island was put under the administration of the Ministerio del Interior y de Justicia (Ministry of Interior and Justice) (2) as part of the Dependencias Federales.

On  August 9, 1972, the island, together with the other islands of the Dependencias Federales, were declared a national park (3) with the park being established on August 18.

See also
Federal Dependencies of Venezuela
List of marine molluscs of Venezuela
List of Poriferans of Venezuela

References

External links
  About La Sola Island
 Map of the Dependencias Federales with location of  La Sola Island

Uninhabited islands of Venezuela
Federal Dependencies of Venezuela
Venezuelan islands of the Leeward Antilles